"Sirens of Ceres" is an episode in the Australian/British science fiction drama television series K-9. It is the fifth episode of Series 1.

Synopsis
When Jorjie hits one of the robot police with a stone, her mother punishes by sending her to the private school MAGDALENA. But the Department are testing an alien mineral weapon, which they can use to control people in the academy.

Plot
A single activist is protesting about CCPC violence when she is apprehended by two of them. K-9, Starkey and Jorjie witness it and Starkey records the arrest to "publicise the violence". Jorjie however decides to take action and throws a stone at one of the CCPCs. It chases after her and Starkey while the other one grabs the activist who is met by Inspector Drake who takes her away. Jorjie and K-9 and cornered by the two CCPCs, When K-9 questions her actions she just says she was "having fun". A third CCPC brings Starkey and confiscates his recording. Drake orders the CCPCs to use an unknown device known as the Inhibitor, which the CCPC puts an alien substance into. It fires at them, however it accidentally destroys the CCPC.

At Jorjie's house June demands to know why Jorjie assaulted the CCPC. Back at the mansion Gryffen is repairing K-9 who suffered minor damage from the explosion, Starkey suspects that the Department is up to something as the sent 4 CCPCs to just one protester. At Department HQ June questions Drake about the Inhibitor, he says it is a submission device. Drake suggests the June sends Jorjie to Magdalene Academy. Two weeks later Jorjie comes to the academy and introduces herself. She finds out that the protester she met earlier is in this school, she warns Jorjie not to put on the bracelets worn by several of the students, saying there has been a strange change in behaviour with some of them. Jorjie takes her advice and doesn't join the Melaina's study group. When she goes to the mansion and complains about the school, Starkey and Gryffen don't agree with her.

While fixing K-9, Gryffen analyses video play back of the explosion and finds the strange substance vaporises when it is put under pressure. K-9 says that the CCPC's used it to try to take control of him, and it is an alien substance. When Jorjie goes to the academy again she finds even her friend has the bracelet, she informs Starkey of the bracelet. Gryffen discovers the identity of the alien substance, it is called Cerulium. K-9 describes the planet Ceres and how lack of free will destroyed its civilization. At the academy the girls give Jorjie a bracelet and she falls under its influence as well. She comes back to the mansion but K-9 destroys the bracelet. She comes back with a fake bracelet and asks where she can buy another one. Drake finds out she knows and the girls attack her but K-9 comes in and destroys all the bracelets. Melaina is the only one remaining, when Drake deactivates her Jorjie reveals to the other students that she was a robot similar to the CCPC.

External links 
 
 K9 Official
 The Doctor Who Site

K-9 (TV series) episodes
2010 British television episodes
Television episodes set in schools